Laurens County is a county located in the U.S. state of South Carolina. As of the 2020 census, its population was 67,539. Its county seat is Laurens.

Laurens County is included in the Greenville-Anderson-Mauldin, SC Metropolitan Statistical Area.

History
Laurens County was formed on March 12, 1785. It was named after Henry Laurens, the fifth president of the Continental Congress.

One of nine modern counties of the Colonial Ninety-Six District, Laurens County hosted more "official" (i.e. officially recognized and contemporaneously documented by competent governments) battles than did half of the original colonies. The Battle of Musgrove Mill was the first time during the American Revolution that regular soldiers of Great Britain were defeated in battle by militia.

Those battles in modern Laurens County were:
 Fort Lindley/Lindler
 Widow Kellet's Block House
 Musgrove's Mill
 Farrow's Station
 Duncan Creek Meeting House
 Indian Creek
 Hammond's Store
 Fort Williams (not to be confused with Williamson's fort some 25 miles south in Greenwood County)
 Cedar Springs (begun in Cross Anchor SC, then an old-fashioned "Hoss Chase" of fifty eight miles through four counties and ended in NC after about 30 hours!)
 Mud Lick Creek
 Hayes' Station. (Joe Goldsmith, State Historian, SC Soc., Sons of the American Revolution)

Geography

National protected areas
 Belfast Wildlife Management Area (part)
 Sumter National Forest (part)

State and local protected areas/sites 
 Lake Rabon Park
 Laurens County Park
 Musgrove Mill State Historic Site

Major water bodies 
 Bush River
 Enoree River
 Lake Greenwood
 Lake Ribbon
 Saluda River

Adjacent counties 
 Spartanburg County - north
 Union County - northeast
 Newberry County - southeast
 Greenwood County - south
 Abbeville County - southwest
 Anderson County - west
 Greenville County - northwest

Major highways

Major infrastructure 
 Laurens County Airport

Demographics

2020 census

As of the 2020 United States census, there were 67,539 people, 25,901 households, and 16,961 families residing in the county.

2010 census
As of the 2010 United States Census, there were 66,537 people, 25,525 households, and 17,707 families living in the county. The racial makeup of the county was 70.4% white, 25.4% black or African American, 0.3% Asian, 0.2% American Indian, 0.1% Pacific islander, 2.3% from other races, and 1.3% from two or more races. Those of Hispanic or Latino origin made up 4.1% of the population. In terms of ancestry, 11.8% were American, 9.8% were Irish, 9.6% were German, and 8.8% were English.

Of the 25,525 households, 32.9% had children under the age of 18 living with them, 46.6% were married couples living together, 17.2% had a female householder with no husband present, 30.6% were non-families, and 26.1% of all households were made up of individuals. The average household size was 2.51 and the average family size was 3.00. The median age was 39.9 years.

The median income for a household in the county was $37,529 and the median income for a family was $45,769. Males had a median income of $36,807 versus $26,799 for females. The per capita income for the county was $18,757. About 14.1% of families and 19.2% of the population were below the poverty line, including 31.0% of those under age 18 and 14.6% of those age 65 or over.

2000 census
As of the census of 2000, there were 69,567 people, 26,290 households, and 18,876 families living in the county.  The population density was 97 people per square mile (38/km2).  There were 30,239 housing units at an average density of 42 per square mile (16/km2).  The racial makeup of the county was 71.57% White, 26.23% Black or African American, 0.28% Native American, 0.15% Asian, 0.05% Pacific Islander, 0.95% from other races, and 0.78% from two or more races.  1.94% of the population were Hispanic or Latino of any race.

There were 26,290 households, out of which 32.50% had children under the age of 18 living with them, 51.10% were married couples living together, 15.60% had a female householder with no husband present, and 28.20% were non-families. 24.60% of all households were made up of individuals, and 9.80% had someone living alone who was 65 years of age or older.  The average household size was 2.55 and the average family size was 3.01.

In the county, the population was spread out, with 25.30% under the age of 18, 9.20% from 18 to 24, 28.50% from 25 to 44, 23.80% from 45 to 64, and 13.20% who were 65 years of age or older.  The median age was 36 years. For every 100 females, there were 93.60 males.  For every 100 females age 18 and over, there were 89.70 males.

The median income for a household in the county was $33,933, and the median income for a family was $39,739. Males had a median income of $30,402 versus $21,684 for females. The per capita income for the county was $15,761.  About 11.60% of families and 14.30% of the population were below the poverty line, including 19.60% of those under age 18 and 13.50% of those age 65 or over.

As of December 2017, the county unemployment rate was 4.4%.

Government and politics
During the 1870 South Carolina gubernatorial election, Joseph Crews was a county election commissioner in Laurens County, and in that capacity had ordered all ballot boxes to be set up in the county seat. This disadvantaged rural voters, but enabled him and the state militia to oversee the election process and to mobilize black voters. However, armed whites attacked the black militia and disarmed them; some were wounded, others murdered. "Like companies of Confederate cavalry", "heavily armed whites" pushed away black voters—until Federal troops came from twenty miles away, with Crews, and took the ballot boxes. but was murdered by Democrats in the run-up to the 1876 South Carolina gubernatorial election.

Until 1948, Laurens County was a Democratic Party stronghold similar to the rest of the Solid South, with Democratic presidential candidates receiving near-unanimous margins of victory in most years. The 20 years from 1948 to 1968 were a highly transitional time for the politics of South Carolina and Laurens County, largely in part due to the Democratic Party's increasing support for African-American civil rights and enfranchisement. South Carolinian Dixiecrat Strom Thurmond won the county in 1948, and Democrats won it back from 1952 to 1960. Barry Goldwater's opposition to the Civil Rights Act led the county to turn Republican for the first time in 1964, which it remained for Richard Nixon's two electoral victories. The county flipped to the Democratic column to support Jimmy Carter from neighboring Georgia in 1976 and 1980, the last Democrat to win the county. From 1984, the county has been consistently Republican in presidential elections, often by wide margins of victory.

2020 presidential election

2016 presidential election

2012 presidential election

2008 presidential election

Education
There are three public school districts in the county. Laurens County District 55 covers what is generally the northeastern half of the county while District 56 covers the southwestern half. The Ware Shoals area is covered by the multi-county Greenwood County District 51. There are two public high schools in the county: Laurens (in Dist. 55) and Clinton (in Dist. 56).

Public K-12 education includes M. S. Bailey Child Development Center, Clinton Elementary, Eastside Elementary, E.B. Morse Elementary, Ford Elementary, Hickory Tavern Elementary, Joanna-Woodson Elementary, Gray Court-Owings Elementary & Middle, Clinton Middle, Hickory Tavern Middle, Laurens Middle, Sanders Middle, Clinton High, and Laurens District 55 High.

Private K-12 education includes Laurens Academy, Summit Classical Charter School, and Thornwell Charter School.

Presbyterian College, located in Clinton, is a four-year liberal-arts school founded in 1880.

Communities

Cities
 Clinton
 Fountain Inn (mostly in Greenville County)
 Laurens (county seat and largest city)

Towns
 Cross Hill
 Gray Court
 Ware Shoals (mostly in Greenwood, partly in Abbeville Counties)
 Waterloo

Census-designated places
 Joanna
 Mountville
 Princeton
 Watts Mills

Unincorporated communities
 Barksdale
 Hickory Tavern
 Kinards (partly in Newberry County)
 Madden
 Owings

Notable people
 James Adair, (c.1709–c.1783), historian, resided in Laurens County in later life.
 Andrew Johnson, 17th president of the United States, worked as a tailor in Laurens during the 1820s.
 William Y. Thompson (born 1922), historian, resided in Clinton from 1950 to 1955.
 William Dunlap Simpson, 78th governor of South Carolina and chief justice of the South Carolina Supreme Court from 1880 to 1890.
 Pat Cannon, United States Representative from Florida; raised in Laurens County.

See also
 List of counties in South Carolina
 National Register of Historic Places listings in Laurens County, South Carolina
 List of national forests of the United States
 List of wilderness areas of the United States

References

External links 

 
 
 Laurens County Chamber of Commerce

 
1785 establishments in South Carolina
Populated places established in 1785
Upstate South Carolina